Carbocisteine, also called carbocysteine, is a mucolytic that reduces the viscosity of sputum and so can be used to help relieve the symptoms of chronic obstructive pulmonary disorder (COPD) and bronchiectasis by allowing the sufferer to bring up sputum more easily. Carbocisteine should not be used with antitussives (cough suppressants) or medicines that dry up bronchial secretions.

It was first described in 1951 and came into medical use in 1960. Carbocisteine is produced by alkylation of cysteine with chloroacetic acid.

References

Dicarboxylic acids
Expectorants
Thioethers
Amino acid derivatives